Rodney Joe Gilbreath (born September 24, 1952) is a former Major League Baseball second baseman from 1972 to 1978 for the Atlanta Braves.

Early life

Rod Gilbreath attended Watkins High School in Laurel, Mississippi. After high school he enrolled in Jones County Junior College.

Professional career

Gilbreath was selected by Atlanta  in the third round (69th overall) of the 1970 Major League Baseball Draft. He divided his next two seasons between Atlanta and the Triple-A Richmond Braves, then played the full seasons of 1975–1978 in Atlanta, exceeding the 100-games played mark during his last three seasons.

In 1976 he led the National League with 20 sacrifice hits.

Gilbreath retired as an active player after the 1980 minor league baseball season. He then rejoined the Braves as a scout, minor league manager, and player development executive. In , he was still a member of the Braves' organization, working as a member of its professional scouting staff.

References

External links
, Baseball Reference (Minor League playing and managing history), or Retrosheet
Pelota Binaria (Venezuelan Winter League)

1952 births
Living people
Atlanta Braves players
Atlanta Braves scouts
Baseball players from Mississippi
Cardenales de Lara players
American expatriate baseball players in Venezuela
Greenwood Braves players
Magic Valley Cowboys players
Major League Baseball second basemen
Mesa Thunderbirds baseball players
Minor league baseball managers
People from Laurel, Mississippi
Portland Beavers players
Richmond Braves players
Savannah Braves players